Bird Island is an island game reserve, with an area of 43.92 ha, in Bass Strait, south-eastern Australia. It is part of Tasmania’s Hunter Island Group which lies between north-west Tasmania and King Island. It is home to about 5,000 pairs of short-tailed shearwaters, the young of which are harvested annually, and about 3,000 pairs of little penguins.

Fauna
The island forms part of the Hunter Island Group Important Bird Area.  As well as the shearwaters and penguins, other breeding seabirds and shorebirds include white-faced storm-petrel, Pacific gull, silver gull and sooty oystercatcher. Reptiles include the metallic skink and abundant tiger snakes.

References

North West Tasmania
Important Bird Areas of Tasmania
Islands of Bass Strait